Dadukou District is a district of Chongqing municipality in China. Dadukou is an industrialised district where the Chongqing Iron & Steel Company Limited ("Chong Gang" or ) is based. Most of the facilities, including school, hospitals, shopping-malls, etc. are organised around Chong Gang.

Administrative divisions

Transport

Metro
Dadukou is currently served by one metro line operated by Chongqing Rail Transit:
 - Ping'an, Dadukou, Xinshancun, Tiantangbao, Jianqiao, Jinjiawan, Liujiaba, Baijusi

References

Districts of Chongqing